Wojciech Antoni Bakun (born 29 January 1981 in Przemyśl) is a Polish politician, member of the Sejm of the 8th term and Przemyśl's Mayor since 2018.

Early career
An IT technician by education, in 2002 he graduated from the Post-Secondary Vocational College. He studied, among others law at WSPiA Rzeszów School of Higher Education. Bakun worked as a sales representative and database administrator in the family business. He started running his own business with his wife. He became a member of the disciplinary court of the Association for the New Constitution Kukiz'15 and secretary of the Merchant Association. In the parliamentary elections in 2015, Bakun ran for the Sejm in the Krosno constituency from the first place on the list of the Kukiz'15 election committee appointed by Paweł Kukiz. He won the seat of an MP in the 8th term, receiving 9406 votes.

From 2016, he was a member of the Parliamentary Team for the Safety of the Immunization Program for Children and Adults.

In the 2018 local government elections, he ran for the president of Przemyśl, obtaining 41.49% of the vote (the best result) and going to the second round. He received 74.84% of the votes, thus winning the election.

He took office after being sworn in on 22 November 2018.

After the 2022 Russian invasion of Ukraine, he declared support for the idea of Poland hosting Ukrainian refugees. In the same year, during a visit by former Italian Minister of the Interior Matteo Salvini to meet refugees along the Polish-Ukrainian border, Bakun told the latter: "See what your friend Putin has done."

References

Polish politicians
1981 births
Living people
Members of the Polish Sejm 2015–2019